Sycamore Meadows is the fourth full-length album by Butch Walker.  It was released in the United States on November 11, 2008.  Walker wrote three tracks ("Ships in a Bottle", "Vessels", and "The 3 Kids In Brooklyn") prior to the Malibu house fires that took his home in November 2007.  These tracks were made available on Walker's Myspace site in demo form in late 2007. Butch stated in an interview with InklingsTV that "[the fires] made [him] feel like [he] had something to prove, something that [he] needed to say".  The physical packaging of the album is, according to Walker, very 'bare-bones', because he wanted it to be 'all about what's on the disc'. The album was acclaimed by music critics. At Metacritic, which assigns a normalized rating out of 100, Sycamore Meadows holds a rating of 81/100, indicating universal acclaim.

Butch released an online-only video for the first single "Ships in a Bottle" through his Myspace website on September 15, 2008. The music video for the second single "The Weight of Her" premiered on Amazon.com on November 24, 2008.

A special 180-gram vinyl-edition release of Sycamore Meadows was made available for the 2008 holiday season.

Track listing

References
 InklingTV interview

2008 albums
Butch Walker albums
Albums produced by Butch Walker